Cole Palen (December 28, 1925 – December 8, 1993) was the founder of the Old Rhinebeck Aerodrome, a living museum of vintage aircraft from 1900-1937 located in Red Hook, New York. Palen's aerodrome boasts one of the finest collections of antique aircraft in the world, including an original Bleriot XI (civil registration N60094), the oldest flying aircraft in the United States and the second oldest in the world.

Biography
James Henry "Cole" Palen Jr. grew up in upstate New York outside the town of Poughkeepsie. As a child, he developed an early fascination with aviation and delighted in building free-flight model airplanes. In later life, he was recognized for his work in the preservation of early aviation history.

After graduating from high school in 1944, Palen joined the United States Army just in time for the Battle of the Bulge. On returning to the United States, he enrolled in the Roosevelt Aviation School at Roosevelt Field, Long Island, to train as a mechanic. Here he was thrilled to find that one of the hangars contained a small museum of World War I aircraft. He dreamed of one day owning his own unique airfield and flying the early aircraft as he felt they should be flown.

In 1951, Roosevelt Field closed and plans were laid for a vast shopping center to be built on the site. Accordingly, the World War I aircraft were put up for sale. The Smithsonian had already acquired three of the aircraft so Cole quickly bid his life savings for the remainder. Soon thereafter he found himself the proud owner of a SPAD XIII, Avro 504K, Curtiss Jenny, Standard J-l, Aeromarine 39B and Sopwith Snipe. He was given just thirty days to remove the aircraft from Roosevelt Field, which required nine 200-mile round trips to the family home where they were stored in disused chicken coops.

In 1959, Palen found a farm for sale near Rhinebeck, New York. This property included a small farmhouse in which an unsolved murder had taken place. Around this time, Palen earned money through the rental of some of his aircraft to a company in California that was filming the World War I movie Lafayette Escadrille, starring Tab Hunter. Between his savings from his employment at Texaco as a mechanic and earnings from the film deal, he was able to purchase the property by paying the back taxes owed on it. He cleared a runway and built makeshift hangars from scrapped materials with his bare hands and the Old Rhinebeck Aerodrome was born.

Palen collected aircraft spanning the period of the birth of aviation up to the start of World War II. He restored them and flew them regularly, and where surviving examples of early original aircraft did not exist, accurate reproductions powered by authentic, vintage-era engines were built. A sizable collection of veteran and vintage vehicles was also collected, nearly all in working order.

In 1960, Palen opened the Old Rhinebeck Aerodrome to the public, the first known American example of a living museum dedicated to preserving pre-World War II aviation history and technology. The first air show took place in 1960 to an audience of approximately 25 people. Gradually word spread and shows were held regularly on the last Sunday of the summer months. As demand grew this was changed to the present format of a show every Saturday and Sunday from mid-June through mid-October.

Palen had a strict philosophy regarding his aircraft; he believed that a plane was not truly a plane unless it could fly. By putting this philosophy into action, Palen made the Old Rhinebeck Aerodrome one of the few places in the world where the public could see aircraft from the dawn of aviation actually fly. Taking this a step further, Palen made both his original and reproduction aircraft as authentic as possible. Original drawings would be used for restoration and creation of accurate reproduction airframes, as well as the installation of original parts and engines into the machines so they would look, sound, and fly the same way they did for the daredevils of early aviation. Because of this, Palen and his aerodrome became the focus of countless newspaper and magazine articles, documentaries, websites, and books.

In April 1965, Cole Palen flew his 1912 Thomas Pusher  from Rhinebeck to New York City and after a three-day trip, appeared on the television game show I've Got a Secret.

On March 17, 1967, Palen married Rita Weidner. Rita took over management of the Old Rhinebeck Aerodrome and brought some order to the administrative side of things.

Palen was associated with several movies, most notably in 1983, when he worked as a stunt double for Woody Allen in the film Zelig. 

Early in 1993, Palen suffered a stroke. Looking to the future, he decided to form the Rhinebeck Aerodrome Museum Foundation. The Foundation came into being during the course of the year under a board of directors and a special new foundation building for the static display of more valuable aircraft was erected opposite the Pioneer, W.W.I and Lindbergh era buildings.

Following the end of the 1993 season, Cole and Rita made their annual pilgrimage to their winter home in Florida, where Palen also maintained a workshop. Early that December, Rita suffered a slight stroke and was admitted to the hospital. It was at this time that Cole died in his sleep. Rita made an excellent recovery and continued with her husband's legacy until her death on August 12, 2002.

In 1995, the Experimental Aircraft Association recognized Palen for his work by posthumously naming him to the EAA's Vintage Aircraft Association Hall of Fame.

Several of the original World War I aircraft that Cole acquired and restored to airworthy condition are now on display in museums such as the United States Air Force Museum, Canada Aviation Museum, and the National Air and Space Museum.

An excellent biography of Cole and the aerodrome was written by E. Gordon Bainbridge and published in 1977, The Old Rhinebeck Aerodrome: The story of Cole Palen and his 'living' aviation museum.

References

External links
Biography of Cole Palen at the Old Rhinebeck Aerodrome website
Photographs taken at Cole Palen's Old Rhinebeck Aerodrome
 1983 Full Cast and Crew of Zelig, IMDb

Museum founders
Aviators from Pennsylvania
Aviation in New York (state)
History of aviation
1925 births
1993 deaths
20th-century philanthropists